Mario Carrero (born 16 May 1952, in Florida) is a Uruguayan musician, best known for his work with Eduardo Larbanois in the duo Larbanois - Carrero.

Biography
From an early age he moved to Montevideo and developed his artistic career as a solo act. It is able to participate in the Festival of Paysandú in 1973, "which won the award for best voice who knows Eduardo Larbanois, which comprised at that time the duo Los Eduardos with Eduardo Lago. After the dissolution of the duo in 1977, decided to create Larbanois with a new duo that would have the name Larbanois - Carrero.

Discography

With Larbanois - Carrero 
 See: Larbanois - Carrero Discography

External links
 Larbanois - Carrero Official Website

1952 births
Living people
Uruguayan composers
Male composers
Uruguayan male guitarists
20th-century Uruguayan male singers
Uruguayan songwriters
Male songwriters
People from Florida Department